Remand may refer to:

 Remand (court procedure), when an appellate court sends a case back to the trial court or lower appellate court
 Pre-trial detention, detention of a suspect prior to a trial, conviction, or sentencing

See also
Remando al viento
Remanence
Ramand District
Remind
Reprimand